L'Amour braque (English: Mad Love) is a 1985 French romantic drama film directed by Andrzej Żuławski and starring Sophie Marceau, Francis Huster, and Tchéky Karyo. The film is about a bank robber on his way to Paris who meets a neurotic dreamer whom he considers to be an idiot. The dreamer follows him everywhere and soon falls in love with his girlfriend, resulting in a tragic ending. The film is loosely inspired by Fyodor Dostoevsky's 1869 novel The Idiot. The film received a Fantasporto International Fantasy Film Award Nomination for Best Film in 1986.

Plot

Following a successful bank robbery, Micky (Tchéky Karyo) tries to take back his girlfriend Mary (Sophie Marceau) who had been taken from him by the brothers Venin. On his way to Paris, Micky meets Leon (Francis Huster), a neurotic dreamer who is considered an idiot by Micky and his associates. Uncertain about Micky's actions, Leon follows him everywhere and eventually falls in love with Mary. This strange love triangle leads to a tragic ending.

Cast

 Sophie Marceau as Mary 
 Francis Huster as Léon 
 Tchéky Karyo as Micky 
 Christiane Jean as Aglaé 
 Jean-Marc Bory as Simon Venin 
 Wladimir Yordanoff as Matalon
 Marie-Christine Adam as Marie's Mother
 Michel Albertini as André
 Saïd Amadis as Le caïd 
  as Le commissaire 
 Ged Marlon as Gilbert Venin 
 Serge Spira as Le baron 
 Julie Ravix as Gisèle 
 Azeddine Bouayad as Harry Cleven
 Pascal Elso

Production

It was the first cinematic collaboration between Sophie Marceau and Andrzej Żuławski, who later made three more films together.

Żuławski cast Marceau after seeing her in Fort Saganne. "I was struck by Sophie’s quality of immediate truth," said Żuławski. "It could have been her youth. But when we met, it was obvious that it came from inside her."

"He gets things out of his actors that they never knew were there," said Marceau of the director. "Sometimes it hurts, yet you are changed by it."

Reception

The film was a commercial flop.

References

External links
 
 
Review of film at Slant Magazine

1985 films
Films based on The Idiot
Films directed by Andrzej Żuławski
French romantic drama films
1980s French-language films
1980s French films